Russell Lee may refer to:

 Russell Lee (writer), writer from Singapore, author of True Singapore Ghost Stories
 Russell Lee (photographer) (1903–1986), American photographer
 Russell Lee (singer), R&B singer featured in a song on They Can't Deport Us All
 Russ Lee (born 1950), American basketball player

See also
Russell Lea, New South Wales